Abid Tounssi, known by his stage name Salah Edin (born 23 June 1980), is a Dutch Moroccan ex-rapper and actor.

Biography
Salah Edin gained recognition as a rapper (first in Arabic, then also in Dutch) in the 1990s and broke through to a larger audience in 2006 when he signed with Dutch hip hop label TopNotch. His third album, WOII, was slated for release in September 2011; the title is a reference to World War II, but carries other connotations as well, with the initials also referring to Willem Oltmans and Geert Wilders. That same year, he acted in a short Moroccan film, with another film already finished and a TV series in the making.

Edin has had a few encounters with controversy. Politician Geert Wilders (of the PVV) used a photograph of Edin for his 2008 film Fitna which was critical of the spread of Islam in Europe and worldwide. Edin's photograph in the documentary was identified as a photo of Mohammed Bouyeri, who was convicted for murdering Theo van Gogh. Edin filed suit, and in response, according to Edin, Wilders offered to appear in a rap song with him. He refused, and the judge decided in favour of Edin, ordering Wilders to pay €3,000 to the rapper and €5,000 to the photographer.

Discography

Demos
 2003 - Hakma

Albums
 2007 - Nederlands Grootste Nachtmerrie ("Netherlands' Biggest Nightmare", TopNotch)
 2009 - HORR
 2011 - WOII

Mixtapes
 2006 - The Official Mixtape

Contributing artist
 2012 - The Rough Guide to the Music of Morocco (World Music Network)

See also 
List of Arab rappers

References

External links
 

1980 births
Living people
Dutch people of Moroccan descent
Dutch rappers
Moroccan rappers
People from Alphen aan den Rijn